This is a list of telephone exchanges located within Greater London. Occasionally, in areas of high demand, two exchanges are located at the same premises; for example Canary Wharf and Poplar.

History

London had a large network of manual exchanges (80 in 1927) and individual telephone exchanges were given names, e.g. Ebbsfleet; a caller asked the operator for Ebbsfleet 1234. However, although the General Post Office (GPO) had commenced installation of automatic exchanges from 1912, the  basic Strowger or SXS switch adopted as standard by the GPO was not suitable for large cities like London. So from 1927 a development of the SXS switch was installed in London, the Director system; first at HOLborn followed by BIShopgate and SLOane exchanges and then WEStern and MONument. Telephones on automatic exchanges had letters as well as numbers marked on the telephone dial, and calls to London numbers used the first three letters of the exchange name followed by four digits, e.g. EUS 1234. The number could be dialled as 387-1234 or spoken to a manual exchange operator as Euston 1234.

London manual exchanges were gradually converted to Director automatic exchanges from 1927. Holborn was the first, at midnight on Saturday 12 November, a local and tandem exchange. Bishopgate and Sloane exchanges followed in six weeks, then Western and Monument exchanges. The London area contained 80 exchanges, and full conversion was to take many years.

Until the late 1960s, some outer London exchanges did not offer direct dialling, and their numbers could be identified in the directory by being printed in light type, unlike normal exchanges, whose first three letters appeared in bold type. To call a Pinner number, for example, you would dial PIN, wait for the operator to answer, then state the 4-figure number required.

As the telephone system was modernised and liberalised with multiple telephone companies and numbers became portable, the rigid correspondence of numeric codes to exchanges was relaxed, but even today it is likely that a (7)387 number, for example, is located in the Euston area. Lists of numbers allocated to BT exchanges in the UK, including London, are available online, and enable the exchange associated with a given number to be found, if applicable. Locations of exchanges, given a postcode in their catchment area, are also documented.

List of exchanges
NOTE: The United Kingdom adopts an open dialling plan for area codes within its public switched telephone network. Therefore, all area codes have a preceding 0 (zero) when dialling from within the United Kingdom. When dialling a UK number from abroad the zero must not be included, but replaced by the calling country's international call prefix followed by the 44, the country code for the UK. Thus a call to the Euston exchange discussed above from the United States would be to 011 (US international prefix) 44 20 (London) 73871234.

The following exchanges are located outside Greater London, but use the London 020 dial code.

See also
Telephone numbers in the United Kingdom

Notes

References

External links
 London Director Exchange Names - Roger W. Haworth
 Old London Telephone Exchange Names - Paul Coxwell
 Old London telephone exchanges - Jane's London (pictures) ;

British Telecom buildings and structures
London
Infrastructure in London
London-related lists